Tropical Vision Limited, or as it is locally known, Channel 7, is a Belize City based television station operating since 1981.

Its Managing Director is Nestor Vasquez.

Programming 
Channel 7 airs a mix of American and Belizean programmes.

7 News 
Prior to 1994, Channel 7 got its news from local radio powerhouse Radio Belize. Beginning on February 14, 1994, 7 News began producing its own newscast, running opposite Great Belize Television's News 5 Live at 6:30 PM Central. There are no regular weekend newscasts other than Friday repeats; 7 News has aired two one-time only Saturday evening newscasts, the latest coming in April 2005 in the midst of the protests in Belize.

Criticism 
Channel 7 is usually more critical of Government foibles than rival Channel 5, and Government officials have pointedly criticized 7 for its hard-hitting analysis of national issues.

Employees of Channel 7 
 Nestor Vasquez (Managing Director)
 Jules Vasquez (News Director/chief news Editor/reporter) 
 
 Indira Craig (Newscaster)
 Courtney Weatherburne (Reporter/newscaster)
 Daniel Ortiz (Reporter)
 Sahar Vasquez(Reporter)
 Angel Noble (Camera)
 Cody Noralez (Camera)
 Dennis Ellis (Camera)
 Melissa Ramsey (Office Manager)

Trivia
In the late 1990s, poet Leroy "Grandmaster" Young got his start on Channel 7 reciting poems at the end of the newscast. Other former employees of Seven include Rodel Beltran Perera, Dennis Peyrefitte, Carla Ayres, Dawn Sampson, Deadra Isaacs (now Haylock), Alfonso and Fortunato Noble and Jim McFadzean and Jacqueline Woods

External links
 Official Site

1981 establishments in Belize
Television channels and stations established in 1981
Television stations in Belize